DWYO (103.1 FM), broadcasting as 103.1 Brigada News FM, is a radio station owned and operated by Brigada Mass Media Corporation. Its studios and transmitter are located at the 2/F, T. Olorga Bldg. Rizal Ave., Puerto Princesa City, with repeaters located in various places in Palawan.

References

External links
Brigada News FM Puerto Princesa FB Page
Brigada News FM Puerto Princesa Website

Radio stations in Puerto Princesa
News and talk radio stations in the Philippines
Radio stations established in 1993